Angela Gomes (born July 16, 1952) is a social worker from Bangladesh. She is the founder and executive director of Banchte Shekha (Learn How To Survive), an NGO since 1976. She won the Magsaysay Award in 1999 for community leadership.

Awards
 "Best Social Worker" award by Bangladesh National Social Welfare Council (1988)
 "Best Female Workers for Social Development" by Anannaya (1997)
 "Kirtimati Nari – Best Social Worker" by Square group (2008)
 "Begum Rokeya Padak" (1999). 
 Honorary Doctorate Degree (Honoris Causa) from International KIIT University, Bhubaneswar, Odisha, India (2014)
 Star Lifetime Award for Social Work (2016)

Works
Her books include "Learning through Works for Adults", "Living with Rights", "Easy Living of Children" and "How I Reached".

References

External links

Living people
1952 births
Bangladeshi social workers
Ramon Magsaysay Award winners
Recipients of Begum Rokeya Padak